The 2014 Colorado Senate elections were held on November 4, 2014 to elect 18 of the 35 members of the Colorado Senate. The election coincided with Colorado House of Representatives elections and other state and federal elections. Primary elections were held on June 24, 2014. Republicans gained control of the chamber for the first time since 2005, gaining three seats from the last election.

Background 
In the previous state Senate election in 2012, Democrats held the chamber with a 5-seat majority of 20 Democratic seats and 15 Republican seats. However, Democrats had their majority reduced to one seat after the 2013 Colorado recall election, where Senator Angela Giron and Senate President John Morse were successfully recalled and replaced by Republicans. Because of this, Republicans only needed a net gain of one seat in order to claim control of the chamber. Democratic senator Evie Hudak was also targeted in the recall election, however she chose to resign instead, triggering an off-cycle election in district 19.

Results

District 
Results of the 2014 Colorado Senate election by district:
Bold - Gain

Italicize - Hold, new member

Incumbents not seeking re-election

Term-limited incumbents 
Five incumbent Senators (including three Republicans and two Democrats) are term-limited, and unable to seek a third term.

 Greg Brophy (R), District 1
 Gail Schwartz (D), District 5
 Scott Renfroe (R), District 13
 Lois Tochtrop (D), District 24
 Ted Harvey (R), District 30

Retiring incumbents 
One incumbent Republican is not seeking re-election, despite being able to do so.
 Steve King (R), District 7

Closest races 

  
  gain
  gain
  
  
  gain
  gain

Detailed results 
Sources:

District 1

District 2

District 3

District 5

District 6

District 7

District 9

District 11

District 13

District 15

District 16

District 19

District 20

District 22

District 24

District 30

District 32

District 34

References 

Colorado Senate elections
2014 elections in the United States
2014 in Colorado